Protein BTG1 is a protein that in humans is encoded by the BTG1 gene.

Function 

The BTG1 gene locus has been shown to be involved in a t(8;12)(q24;q22) chromosomal translocation in a case of B-cell chronic lymphocytic leukemia. It is a member of a family of antiproliferative genes. BTG1 expression is maximal in the G0/G1 phases of the cell cycle and downregulated when cells progressed through G1. It negatively regulates cell proliferation.

Interactions 

BTG1 has been shown to interact with:
 CNOT7, 
 CNOT8,
 HOXB9,  and
 PRMT1.

Clinical relevance 

Recurrent mutations in this gene have been associated to cases of diffuse large B-cell lymphoma.

Maintenance of adult neural stem cells 

Recent data, obtained in a new model of mouse lacking the BTG1 gene, indicate that BTG1 is essential for the proliferation and expansion of stem cells in the adult neurogenic niches, i.e. the dentate gyrus and sub ventricular zone (see for review). In particular, BTG1 keeps adult neural stem cells in quiescence, preserving the neural stem cells pool from depletion. In the absence of BTG1, the stem and progenitor cells initially hyper proliferate and then in the longer period lose the ability to proliferate and expand. Other recent data indicate that physical exercise can fully reconstitute the proliferative defect of stem cells that follows the ablation of the BTG1 gene, suggesting that the pool of neural stem cells maintains a hidden form of plasticity which is tightly controlled by BTG1; hence, BTG1 might prevent the depletion of stem cells in the presence of strong neurogenic stimuli or of neural degenerative stimuli.

Btg1 plays a role also in the expansion of cerebellar granule precursor cells. In fact the deletion of Btg1 leads in mouse to uncontrolled proliferation of the cerebellar precursor cells during the early postnatal period. Consequently, in the adult, the cerebellum lacking Btg1 is significantly larger and the motor coordination is heavily impaired.

The closest homolog of BTG1 is BTG2, which also controls the proliferation and differentiation of adult neural stem cells; the role of BTG2, however, appears to differ from that of BTG1 being probably more relevant in controlling the terminal differentiation  of neural stem and progenitor cells in the adult neurogenic niches.

References

External links

Further reading 

 
 
 
 
 
 
 
 
 
 
 
 

Oncogenes